Haqeeqat (Reality) is a Pakistani anthology television series consisting of a collection of assorted family stories which premiered on 1 December 2019 on A-Plus TV. The series airs weekly with a different cast on each episode and based on short stories of real life situations.

Cast 
 Kinza Hashmi as Anna (Ep:1)
 Wahaj Ali as asif(Ep:1)
 Beenish Raja as Hina (Ep:1)
 Saboor Aly as Aliya (Ep:2)
 Ali Abbas as Atiq Ahmed (Ep:2)
 Srha Asghar as Hina; Atiq's boss (Ep:2)
 Ghana Ali as Sonia Aamir (Ep:3)
 Hassan Niazi as Muzammil (Ep:3) 
 Komal Aziz Khan as Eshal/Mahnoor (Ep:4/13)
 Hasan Khan as Waseem Inayat (Ep:4)
 Firdous Jamal as Inayat Sahab (Ep:4)
 Humaira Bano as Inayat's wife (Ep:4)
 Zainab Shabbir as Faria (Ep:5)
 Arslan Asad Butt as Ahmed (Ep:5)
 Arsalan Raja as Ahmed's brother (Ep:5)
 Sunita Marshall as Sughra (Ep:6)
 Syed Jibran as Sahab Jee/Faisal (Ep:6/11)
 Javeria Abbasi as Javeria (Ep:7)
 Shahood Alvi as Talat (Ep:7)
 Hina Sheikh as Javeria's maid (Ep:7)
 Anmol Baloch as Mehreen (Ep:8)
 Usama Khan as Sarim (Ep:8)
 Salman Saeed as Adnan (Ep:8)
 Kiran Tabeir as Fiza/Shiza (Ep:9)
 Noman Habib as Faraz (Ep:9)
 Farah Nadir as Zain's mother (Ep:9)
 Yasmin Haq as Fiza's friend (Ep:9)
 Nazish Jahangir as Safaa (Ep:10)
 Azfar Rehman as Almir (Ep:10)
 Shameen Khan as Dua (Ep:10)
 Aamir Qureshi as Dua's father (Ep:10)
 Kiran Haq as Kashf
 Asim Mehmood as Wahaj
 Anzela Abbasi as Saira
 Huma Nawab as Saira's mother
 Javed Jamil as Saira's father
 Tehreem Zuberi as Api; Kashf's sister
 Mansha Pasha as Mahira
 Agha Ali as Armaan
 Ismat Zaidi as Armaan's mother
 Jahanzeb Khan as Muneeb (Ep:13)
 Mehmood Aslam as Rija's father (Ep:13)
 Sehar Khan as Rija (Ep:13)
 Zhalay Sarhadi as Anamta (Ep:14)
 Hassan Ahmed as Saif (Ep:14)
 Mariyam Nafees as Amber (Ep:14)
 Khalid Anam as Anamta's father (Ep:14)
 Noman Ejaz as Yawer (Ep:15)

List of episodes

References

External links
 

2019 Pakistani television series debuts
Pakistani drama television series
Urdu-language television shows
A-Plus TV original programming
Pakistani anthology television series